California Proposition 57 may refer to:
 California Proposition 57 (2004)
 California Proposition 57 (2016)